Richard Bunny may refer to:

Richard Bunny (died 1584), MP for Bramber and Boroughbridge
Richard Bunny (1541–1608), MP for Aldborough